The Funduloidea is a superfamily of fishes in the suborder Cyprinodontoidei, one of two suborders which make up the order Cyprinodontiformes. It is one of four superfamilies within the suborder.

Families 
There are three families in the superfamily Funduloidea:

 Family Profundulidae Hoedeman & Bronner, 1951
 Family Goodeidae Jordan & Gilbert, 1883
 Family Fundulidae Günther, 1866

References

Cyprinodontiformes
Taxa named by Albert Günther